Bahiella is a genus of plants in the family Apocynaceae first described as a genus in 2006. The entire group is endemic to the State of Bahia in northeastern Brazil, the state after which the genus is named.

Species
 Bahiella blanchetii (A.DC.) J.F.Morales
 Bahiella infundibuliflora J.F.Morales

References

Endemic flora of Brazil
Apocynaceae genera
Echiteae